Oblimersen (INN, trade name Genasense; also known as Augmerosen and bcl-2 antisense oligodeoxynucleotide G3139) is an antisense oligodeoxyribonucleotide being studied as a possible treatment for several types of cancer, including chronic lymphocytic leukemia, B-cell lymphoma, and breast cancer. It may kill cancer cells by blocking the production of Bcl-2—a protein that makes cancer cells live longer—and by making them more sensitive to chemotherapy.

History
The antisense oligonucleotide drug oblimersen was developed by Genta Incorporated to target Bcl-2. An antisense DNA or RNA strand is non-coding and complementary to the coding strand (which is the template for producing respectively RNA or protein). An antisense drug is a short sequence of RNA which hybridises with and inactivates mRNA, preventing the protein from being formed.

It was shown that the proliferation of human lymphoma cells (with t(14;18) translocation) could be inhibited by antisense RNA targeted at the start codon region of Bcl-2 mRNA. In vitro studies led to the identification of oblimersen, which is complementary to the first 6 codons of Bcl-2 mRNA.

These have shown successful results in Phase I/II trials for lymphoma, and a large Phase III trial was launched in 2004.

By the first quarter 2010, the drug had not received FDA approval due to disappointing results in a melanoma trial. Although its safety and efficacy have not been established for any use, Genta Incorporated still claims on its website that studies are currently under way to examine the potential role of oblimersen in a variety of clinical indications.

References

External links 
 Augmerosen entry in the public domain NCI Dictionary of Cancer Terms

Experimental cancer drugs
Antisense RNA
Therapeutic gene modulation